North High School is a public high school in Akron, Ohio.  It is one of seven high schools in the Akron Public Schools district.

History
North High School was established in 1915 as Akron's fourth high school, after Central, South, and West. The school was originally located at the northwest corner of Dayton Street and East Tallmadge Avenue in what later became Jennings Middle School, a building that stood until 2012. In 1931 the present North High School was built on Gorge Boulevard and housed students in grades 10–12.

Completion of the building was delayed 24 years because of the depression and two wars. In 1955 an auditorium, cafeteria, and gymnasium were added, followed by a vocational wing in 1970. The school expanded to serve grades 9–12 in September 1972.

The old building has art deco tilework on its exterior.  The tilework features theme of brightly colored neighbors, stylized flowers, and images of pre-industrial humans depicted in industrious scenes.

Education

Sports

State championships

Boys basketball - 1935, 1939 
Boys cross country – 1941, 1943, 1946, 1947, 1958 
Boys Track - 1956, 1996(runner-up)

Notable alumni

 Jack DiLauro, Former MLB player (New York Mets, Houston Astros)
 Mike Fox, NFL player
 Leonard Humphries, NFL and CFL player
 Gene Thomas, AFL player

External links
North High School Website
District Website

Notes and references

High schools in Akron, Ohio
Public high schools in Ohio